In sociology, the concept of religiosity has proven difficult to define. The Oxford English Dictionary suggests: "Religiousness; religious feeling or belief. [...] Affected or excessive religiousness". Different scholars have seen this concept as broadly about religious orientations and degrees of involvement or commitment. Religiosity, measured at the levels of individuals or of groups, includes experiential, ritualistic, ideological, intellectual, consequential, creedal, communal, doctrinal, moral, and cultural dimensions. Sociologists of religion have observed that an individual's experience, beliefs, sense of belonging, and behavior often are not congruent with their actual religious behavior, since there is much diversity in how one can be religious or not. Multiple problems exist in measuring religiosity. For instance, measures of variables such as church attendance produce different results when different methods are used - such as traditional surveys vs time-use surveys.

Measuring religion

Inaccuracy of polling and identification

The reliability of any poll results, in general and specifically on religion, can be questioned due numerous factors such as:
 there have been very low response rates for polls since the 1990s
 polls consistently fail to predict government election outcomes, which signifies that polls in general do not capture the actual views of the population
 biases in wording or topic affect how people respond to polls
 polls categorize people based on limited choices
 polls often generalize broadly
 polls have shallow or superficial choices, which complicate expressing their complex religious beliefs and practices
 interviewer and respondent fatigue is very common

The measurement of religiosity is hampered by the difficulties involved in defining what is meant by the term and the variables it entails. Numerous studies have explored the different components of religiosity, with most finding some distinction between religious beliefs/doctrine, religious practice, and spirituality. When religiosity is measured, it is important to specify which aspects of religiosity are referred to.

The 2008 American Religious Identification Survey (ARIS) found a difference between how people identify and what people believe. While only 0.7% of U.S. adults identified as atheist, 2.3% said there is no such thing as a god. Only 0.9% identified as agnostic, but 10.0% said there is either no way to know if a god exists or they weren't sure. Another 12.1% said there is a higher power but no personal god. In total, only 15.0% identified as Nones or No Religion, but 24.4% did not believe in the traditional concept of a personal god. The conductors of the study concluded, "The historic reluctance of Americans to self-identify in this manner or use these terms seems to have diminished. Nevertheless ... the level of under-reporting of these theological labels is still significant ... many millions do not subscribe fully to the theology of the groups with which they identify."

Existing nationally representative polls such as Pew and Gallup indicate atheist prevalence is relatively low (3% -11%) in the United States, however, in one study using validated unmatched counting interviewing technique, in which people did not need to "admit" explicitly to a certain position, the number of people who did not believe in a god was indirectly estimated to be 26% overall. The authors noted that 26% of Baby boomers and millennials did not have belief in a god.

According to a Pew study in 2009, only 5% of the total US population did not have a belief in a god. Out of all those without a belief in a god, only 24% self-identified as "atheist", while 15% self-identified as "agnostic", 35% self-identified as "nothing in particular", and 24% identified with a religious tradition.

According to a Gallup's editor in chief, Frank Newport, numbers on surveys may not be the whole story. In his view, declines in religious affiliation or declines in belief in God on surveys may not actually reflect an actual decline in these beliefs among people since increased honesty on spiritual matters to interviewers may merely be increasing since people may feel more comfortable today expressing viewpoints that were previously deviant.

Diversity in an individuals' beliefs, affiliations, and behaviors

Decades of anthropological, sociological, and psychological research have established that "religious congruence" (the assumption that religious beliefs and values are tightly integrated in an individual's mind or that religious practices and behaviors follow directly from religious beliefs or that religious beliefs are chronologically linear and stable across different contexts) is actually rare. People’s religious ideas are fragmented, loosely connected, and context-dependent; like in all other domains of culture and in life. The beliefs, affiliations, and behaviors of any individual are complex activities that have many sources including culture. As examples of religious incongruence he notes, "Observant Jews may not believe what they say in their Sabbath prayers. Christian ministers may not believe in God. And people who regularly dance for rain don’t do it in the dry season."

Demographic studies often show wide diversity of religious beliefs, belonging, and practices in both religious and non-religious populations. For instance, out of Americans who are not religious and not seeking religion: 68% believe in God, 12% are atheists, 17% are agnostics; also, in terms of self-identification of religiosity 18% consider themselves religious, 37% consider themselves as spiritual but not religious, and 42% considers themselves as neither spiritual nor religious; and 21% pray every day and 24% pray once a month. Global studies on religion also show diversity.

Components
Numerous studies have explored the different components of human religiosity (Brink, 1993; Hill & Hood 1999). What most have found is that there are multiple dimensions (they often employ factor analysis). For instance, Cornwall, Albrecht, Cunningham and Pitcher (1986) identify six dimensions of religiosity based on the understanding that there are at least three components to religious behavior: knowing (cognition in the mind), feeling (effect to the spirit), and doing (behavior of the body). For each of these components of religiosity, there were two cross classifications resulting in the six dimensions:
Cognition
traditional orthodoxy
particularistic orthodoxy
Effect
Palpable
Tangible
Behavior
religious behavior
religious participation

Other researchers have found different dimensions, ranging generally from four to twelve components. What most measures of religiosity find is that there is at least some distinction between religious doctrine, religious practice, and spirituality.

For example, one can accept the truthfulness of the Bible (belief dimension), but never attend a church or even belong to an organized religion (practice dimension).  Another example is an individual who does not hold orthodox Christian doctrines (belief dimension), but does attend a charismatic worship service (practice dimension) in order to develop his/her sense of oneness with the divine (spirituality dimension).

An individual could disavow all doctrines associated with organized religions (belief dimension), not affiliate with an organized religion or attend religious services (practice dimension), and at the same time be strongly committed to a higher power and feel that the connection with that higher power is ultimately relevant (spirituality dimension). These are explanatory examples of the broadest dimensions of religiosity and may not be reflected in specific religiosity measures.

Most dimensions of religiosity are correlated, meaning people who often attend church services (practice dimension) are also likely to score highly on the belief and spirituality dimensions. But individuals do not have to score high on all dimensions or low on all dimensions; their scores can vary by dimension.

Sociologists have differed over the exact number of components of religiosity. Charles Glock's five-dimensional approach (Glock, 1972: 39) was among the first of its kind in the field of sociology of religion. Other sociologists adapted Glock's list to include additional components (see for example, a  six component measure by Mervin F. Verbit).

Contributions

Genes and environment

The contributions of genes and environment to religiosity have been quantified in studies of twins (Bouchard et al., 1999; Kirk et al., 1999) and sociological studies of welfare, availability, and legal regulations  (state religions, etc.).

Koenig et al. (2005) report that the contribution of genes to variation in religiosity (called heritability) increases from 12% to 44% and the contribution of shared (family) effects decreases from 56% to 18% between adolescence and adulthood.

A market-based theory of religious choice and governmental regulation of religion have been the dominant theories used to explain variations of religiosity between societies.  However, Gill and Lundsgaarde (2004)  documented a much stronger correlation between welfare state spending and religiosity.  (see diagram)

Just-world hypothesis
Studies have found belief in a just world to be correlated with aspects of religiousness.

Risk-aversion
Several studies have discovered a positive correlation between the degree of religiousness and risk aversion.

See also
Demographics of atheism
Religion and personality
Spiritual but not religious

Demographics:
Importance of religion by country
Religiosity and intelligence
Religion and happiness
Religiosity and education

References

External links 

 
 Brink, T.L. 1993. Religiosity: measurement. in Survey of Social Science: Psychology, Frank N. Magill, Ed., Pasadena, CA: Salem Press, 1993, pp. 2096–2102.
 
 Hill, Peter C. and Hood, Ralph W. Jr. 1999. Measures of Religiosity. Birmingham, Alabama: Religious Education Press. 
 
 

Personality traits
Religious studies
Religious practices